Fatal Portrait is the debut album by Danish heavy metal band King Diamond. It was produced by Rune Hoyer and released in 1986 via Roadrunner Records. Guitarist Andy LaRocque joined the album recording sessions at the last minute, as the band's second guitarist at the time "wasn't working out" in the studio. As a result, it is the only King Diamond album which does not feature any writing credits from LaRocque. Recording a solo for "Dressed in White" functioned as his audition for joining the band. Along with The Spider's Lullabye, it is one of the band's only albums which is not a whole concept album.

Fatal Portrait has sold over 100,000 copies in North America alone. The title of the album comes from The Picture of Dorian Gray by Oscar Wilde. Wilde describes the painting as "the fatal portrait" several times throughout the novel.

Plot
Five songs on this album (first four and "Haunted") form a short story. Narrator sees a face in "every candle that [he] burns". This face speaks one word to him: "Jonah". So he finds an old book, speaks a rhyme and frees the spirit from the candle. It's the spirit of a little girl named Molly, who tells him her story, that happened seven years before. Mrs. Jane kept her 4-year-old daughter Molly in the attic until she (Molly) died. Before, Mrs. Jane painted Molly's portrait and put it above the fireplace, so that Molly would become immortal; however, Molly made the portrait speak to her mother, so that Jane would know about Molly's pain. Mrs. Jane then speaks a rhyme and burns the portrait. A free spirit of Molly returns to haunt her until she goes insane.

Track listing

Personnel
Band members
King Diamond – lead and backing vocals, all guitars on "Voices from the Past", producer
Andy LaRocque – guitar
Michael Denner – guitar, assistant producer
Timi Hansen – bass
Mikkey Dee – drums

Production
Rune Höyer – producer
Roberto Falcao – engineer

References

King Diamond albums
1986 debut albums
Roadrunner Records albums